Abdelhak Hameurlaïne (born 19 March 1972) is a former professional tennis player from Algeria. He learnt the sport at Tennis club d'Hydra, in Algiers Province.

A record 19-time national champion, Hameurlaïne played in a total of 55 Davis Cup ties for Algeria between 1990 and 2011, and is a recipient of the Davis Cup Commitment Award.

Nicknamed Hakou, his sister Lamia is also a former professional tennis player.

References

Algerian male tennis players
1972 births
Place of birth missing (living people)
Mediterranean Games silver medalists for Algeria
Competitors at the 2001 Mediterranean Games
Mediterranean Games medalists in tennis
African Games bronze medalists for Algeria
African Games medalists in tennis
Competitors at the 2007 All-Africa Games
Living people
Islamic Solidarity Games competitors for Algeria
Islamic Solidarity Games medalists in tennis
21st-century Algerian people